Vyacheslav Ponomarev or Vyacheslav Ponomaryov may refer to:

Vyacheslav Ponomarev (footballer), an Uzbek footballer
Vyacheslav Ponomarev (public figure), in Donbas, a self-declared mayor of Sloviansk